Piera refers to a municipality that covers a large portion of the southeastern corner of the comarca of Anoia in Catalonia, Spain. It may also refer to:

People with the given name Piera
Piera Aiello (born 1967), Italian police informant and politician
Piera Coppola (born 1968), American voice actress
Piera Aulagnier (1923–1990), French psychiatrist and psychoanalyst
Piera Hudson (born 1996), New Zealander alpine skier
Piera Degli Esposti (1938–2021), Italian actress
Piera Tizzoni (born 1940), Italian long jumper
Piera Pistono (born 1938), Italian pianist and composer
Piera Martell (born 1943), Swiss singer
Piera-Cassandra Maglio (born 1976), Italian footballer
Piera Verri (1913–2006), Italian basketball player
Piera Fatehial, Pakistani politician

People with the surname Piera
Fran Piera, Spanish footballer
Nuria Piera (born 1960), Dominican journalist
Vicente Piera (1903–1960), Spanish footballer
Fermín Martín Piera (1954–2001), Spanish taxonomist
Salva Piera (born 1991), Spanish field hockey player
Josep Tomàs i Piera (1900–1976), Catalan lawyer and politician
Julia Piera (born 1970), Spanish contemporary poet

Other
The Story of Piera, a 1983 Italian drama
Haetera piera, a butterfly species
La sombra de Piera, Venezuelan telenovela broadcast
Piera Observatory, astronomical observatory

Italian feminine given names
Spanish-language surnames